Club Baloncesto Marbella, is a professional basketball team based in Marbella, Andalusia, that currently plays in LEB Plata.

History
Founded in 1984, CB Marbella decided to join the fifth tier in 2016. After only one season, the club decided to go one step further and achieved a vacant spot in Liga EBA in 2017.

In its first season, the club qualified to the final stage but could not achieve promotion. Despite failing again in the final stage of their second season in the league, the club would be elected to cover one vacant place in LEB Plata, third tier.

Season by season

References

External links
Official Page

Basketball teams established in 1984
Basketball teams in Andalusia
LEB Plata teams
Former Liga EBA teams
Sport in Marbella